LEGO Mindstorms EV3 is the third generation robotics kit in LEGO's Mindstorms line. It is the successor to the second generation LEGO Mindstorms NXT kit. The "EV" designation refers to the "evolution" of the Mindstorms product line. "3" refers to the fact that it is the third generation of computer modules - first was the RCX and the second is the NXT. It was officially announced on January 4, 2013, and was released in stores on September 1, 2013. The education edition was released on August 1, 2013. There are many competitions using this set, including the FIRST LEGO League Challenge and the World Robot Olympiad, sponsored by LEGO.

Overview 
The biggest change from the LEGO Mindstorms NXT and NXT 2.0 to the EV3 is the technological advances in the programmable brick. The main processor of the NXT was an ARM7 microcontroller, whereas the EV3 has a more powerful ARM9 CPU running Linux. A USB connector and Micro SD slot (up to 32GB) are new to the EV3. It comes with the plans to build 5 different robots: EV3RSTORM, GRIPP3R, R3PTAR, SPIK3R, and TRACK3R. LEGO has also released instructions online to build 12 additional projects: ROBODOZ3R, BANNER PRINT3R, EV3MEG, BOBB3E, MR-B3AM, RAC3 TRUCK, KRAZ3, EV3D4, EL3CTRIC GUITAR, DINOR3X, WACK3M, and EV3GAME. It uses a program called LEGO Mindstorms EV3 Home Edition, which is developed by LabVIEW, to write code using blocks instead of lines. However it can also be programmed on the actual robot and saved. MicroPython support has been recently added.

The EV3 Home (31313) set consists of: 1 EV3 programmable brick, 2 Large Motors, 1 Medium Motor, 1 Touch Sensor, 1 Color Sensor, 1 Infrared Sensor, 1 Remote Control, cables, USB cable, and 585 TECHNIC elements.

The Education EV3 Core Set (45544) set consists of: 1 EV3 programmable brick, 2 Large Motors, 1 Medium Motor, 2 Touch Sensors, 1 Color Sensor, 1 Gyroscopic Sensor, 1 Ultrasonic Sensor, cables, USB cable, 1 Rechargeable battery and 547 TECHNIC elements.

An expansion set for the Educational Core Set, which can be bought separately, contains 853 LEGO elements. However, the expansion set and the educational set combined do not contain enough components necessary to build most robots of the retail set. This contrasts with NXT; the educational set combined with the resource set could build any of the retail designs. The EV3 educational set was released a month earlier than the retail set, on August 1, 2013. Robots that can be built with the core education set are the EV3 educator robot, the GyroBoy, the Colour Sorter, the Puppy and the Robot Arm H25. Robots that can be built with the expansion set are the Tank Bot, the Znap, the Stair Climber, the Elephant and a remote control. Another robot that can be built with a pair of core sets and an expansion set is the Spinner Factory. NXT's Hitechnic sensors Blocks can be used with EV3 & NXT.

NXT's sensors can be used with the EV3. It can boot an alternative operating system from a microSD card, which makes it possible to run ev3dev, a Debian Linux-based operating system.

Compatibility
All NXT sensors, motors, and building elements work with EV3 and are recognized as NXT sensors/motors when plugged in. EV3 sensors do not work with the NXT, but EV3 motors do. The NXT brick can be programmed with the EV3 software, but lacks some software features. EV3 software can be used to program the NXT, but some extra programming-blocks must be downloaded, such as the UltraSonic sensor (which is included in the standard NXT kit, but not the standard EV3 kit). The EV3 brick cannot be programmed with the standard NXT software, but some third-party software supports both systems.

Notable robots made with the EV3 platform
 The Braigo is a robotic Braille printer designed by Shubham Banerjee, a 12-year-old boy from Santa Clara, California in the Silicon Valley region. It is a modified version of the BANNER PRINT3R project, designed by Ralph Hempel. Its low cost (US$354) is an advantage over typical Braille printers (which can cost upwards of $2000).
 The CubeStormer III is a Rubik's cube solving robot, the former Guinness World Records record holder for the fastest Rubik's Cube solving robot - 3.256 seconds. The previous record of 5.27 seconds was held by the CubeStormer II, which was built with previous generation NXT parts. The CubeStormer III broke the record on March 15, 2014.

Enhancements 
On the EV3 AM1808 platform, it is possible with a small hack to double the encoder's resolution. By enabling edge triggered interrupts on the encoder B line (called direction line by LEGO), it is possible to have 720 increments per turn instead of 360. This enhancement allows for smoother rotation at low speed and better position control. This hack was not possible on the NXT due to a hardware limitation. The modified firmware implementing this modification is called EV3.14.

See also

 ROBOTC
 Dexter Industries - Sensors for the EV3
 LeJOS - Firmware and Java API replacement for EV3 programming.
 C-STEM Studio

References

External links

 
 Open Roberta Lab - The first cloud-based and open-source IDE for EV3
 CoderZ, an online learning environment with an EV3 online simulator
 ev3dev a linux debian os for ev3
 cpp4robots an extension for Microsoft Visual Studio that enables programming EV3 in C/C++
 Robot JavaScript a JavaScript compiler for EV3. Includes a development environment with syntax highlighting and code sharing.

Educational toys
Embedded systems
 
Products introduced in 2013
Robot kits
Electronic toys
2013 in robotics